Major General Charles Higbee Bridges (March 1, 1873 – September 11, 1948) was an officer in the United States Army who served as Adjutant General of the U.S. Army from 1928 to 1933.

Biography
Charles H. Bridges was born and raised in Illinois.   He entered the United States Military Academy on 21 June 1893 and graduated as a Second Lieutenant in the 6th Infantry on 11 June 1897.   He was transferred to the 22nd Infantry on 8 March 1898.

Bridges having fought at San Juan and the siege of Santiago in Cuba, then participated in the Philippine-American War, where he was the custodian for four months of the rebel leader Aguinaldo.    He was promoted to First Lieutenant on 2 March 1899 and to Captain in the 15th Infantry on 28 June 1902.

During First World War, he went to France as the Inspector General of the 2nd Division and later became its G-1 (Assistant Chief of Staff for Personnel) until transferred as G-1 to the VI Army Corps in July 1918.  For his service in the war he received the Army Distinguished Service Medal and the French Legion of Honor. The citation for his Army DSM reads:

In 1928, he became the Adjutant General of the U.S. Army.  After 40 years of service he retired in 1933 as a Major General.  He died in 1948 in Sandwich, Massachusetts on Cape Cod.  He was buried in Arlington National Cemetery with his wife Sadie Marie (1879–1969).

He was married to Sadie Marie Bridges (1879–1969).

Awards
 Distinguished Service Medal
 Indian Campaign Medal
 Spanish Campaign Medal
 Philippine Campaign Medal
 Mexican Border Service Medal
 Victory Medal
 Officer, Legion of Honor (France)

See also

 List of Adjutant Generals of the U.S. Army

References

 

1873 births
1948 deaths
Adjutants general of the United States Army
Burials at Arlington National Cemetery
People from Sandwich, Massachusetts
United States Army generals
United States Military Academy alumni
Military personnel from Illinois
Recipients of the Distinguished Service Medal (US Army)
United States Army personnel of World War I
American military personnel of the Philippine–American War
United States Army Infantry Branch personnel